Elections to Craigavon Borough Council were held on 15 May 1985 on the same day as the other Northern Irish local government elections. The election used four district electoral areas to elect a total of 26 councillors.

Election results

Note: "Votes" are the first preference votes.

Districts summary

|- class="unsortable" align="centre"
!rowspan=2 align="left"|Ward
! % 
!Cllrs
! % 
!Cllrs
! %
!Cllrs
! %
!Cllrs
! % 
!Cllrs
! %
!Cllrs
! %
!Cllrs
!rowspan=2|TotalCllrs
|- class="unsortable" align="center"
!colspan=2 bgcolor="" | UUP
!colspan=2 bgcolor="" | DUP
!colspan=2 bgcolor="" | SDLP
!colspan=2 bgcolor="" | Sinn Féin
!colspan=2 bgcolor="" | Workers' Party
!colspan=2 bgcolor="" | Alliance
!colspan=2 bgcolor="white"| Others
|-
|align="left"|Craigavon Central
|bgcolor="40BFF5"|38.9
|bgcolor="40BFF5"|3
|30.7
|2
|11.4
|1
|7.2
|0
|7.0
|1
|4.8
|0
|0.0
|0
|7
|-
|align="left"|Loughside
|11.5
|1
|6.6
|0
|bgcolor="#99FF66"|40.3
|bgcolor="#99FF66"|2
|23.2
|1
|18.4
|1
|0.0
|0
|0.0
|0
|5
|-
|align="left"|Lurgan
|bgcolor="40BFF5"|48.0
|bgcolor="40BFF5"|4
|30.6
|2
|9.6
|1
|6.8
|0
|0.0
|0
|5.0
|0
|0.0
|0
|7
|-
|align="left"|Portadown
|bgcolor="40BFF5"|38.5
|bgcolor="40BFF5"|3
|29.4
|2
|14.3
|1
|12.0
|1
|0.0
|0
|5.8
|0
|0.0
|0
|7
|- class="unsortable" class="sortbottom" style="background:#C9C9C9"
|align="left"| Total
|36.1
|11
|25.7
|6
|17.2
|5
|11.5
|2
|5.2
|2
|4.3
|0
|0.0
|0
|26
|-
|}

District results

Craigavon Central

1985: 3 x UUP, 2 x DUP, 1 x SDLP, 1 x Workers' Party

Loughside

1985: 2 x SDLP, 1 x Sinn Féin, 1 x Workers' Party, 1 x UUP

Lurgan

1985: 4 x UUP, 2 x DUP, 1 x SDLP

Portadown

1985: 3 x UUP, 2 x DUP, 1 x SDLP, 1 x Sinn Féin

References

Craigavon Borough Council elections
Craigavon